The Imaginary may refer to:

 The Imaginary (novel) (2014), written by A. F. Harold and illustrated by Emily Gravett
 The Imaginary (film) (2022), directed by Yoshiyuki Momose and produced by Studio Ponoc
 The Imaginary (Sartre) (1940), by Jean-Paul Sartre
 "The Imaginary" (short story) (1942), by Isaac Asimov
 The Imaginary (psychoanalysis), contrasted with The Real and The Symbolic by Jacques Lacan
 The social imaginary, a concept in sociology

See also 
 Imaginary (disambiguation)